Ítalo Anderson Duarte de Santana (born February 22, 1989 in Maceió), simply known as Ítalo, is a Brazilian footballer who plays as defender for Treze.

Career statistics

References

External links

1989 births
Living people
Brazilian footballers
Association football defenders
Clube de Regatas Brasil players
Treze Futebol Clube players
People from Maceió
Sportspeople from Alagoas